Ege Erkurt (born 10 January 1988), better known by his stage name Patron, is a Turkish rapper and songwriter.

Career 
Erkurt was born on 10 January 1988 in Mersin, Turkey. He began doing rap when he was 15. He has recorded a lot of demo in 2005. These demos have attracted attention by many websites. His big brother Saian is rapper as him.

Discography

Studio albums 
 Sosyopat (2018)

Singles 
 "Kaybedecek Ne Kaldı?" (2018)
 "Benden Bu Kadar" (2019)
 "Kırgın Adımlar" (feat. FRO) (2019)
 "Mayday" (feat. Ati242) (2019)
 "Hayvan" (2019)
 "Goal" (2019)
 "Haset" (2019)
 "S.O.S" (feat. Saian) (2020)
 "Darbe" (feat. Emir Can İğrek) (2020)
 "Siyah" (feat. Sagopa Kajmer) (2020)
 "Ölümsüz" (2020)

As featured artist 
Albums
 Pmc Legacy vol.1 (2019)
 Pmc Legacy vol.2 (2020)

References

External links 

 Patron on Spotify

Living people
1988 births
Turkish rappers
Turkish hip hop
Turkish lyricists
Turkish male singers
People from Mersin